Trilling Peaks is a group of linear nunataks: the three main peaks standing three miles south of South Masson Range in the Framnes Mountains, Mac. Robertson Land. Mapped by Norwegian cartographers from air photos taken by the Lars Christensen Expedition, 1936–37, and named Trillingnutane (the triplet peaks).

Features

 Price Nunatak
 Van Hulssen Nunatak
 Watson Nunatak

Mountain ranges of Mac. Robertson Land